Billboard Top Country & Western Records of 1956 is made up of three year-end charts compiled by Billboard magazine ranking the year's top country and western records based on record sales, juke box plays, and jockey plays.

Ray Price's "Crazy Arms was the year's No. 1 record on both the retail and jockey charts.

Several newcomers, including three from the Sun Records label, made impressive debuts:
 Elvis Presley had five records that placed in the top 10 on at least one of the year-end country charts. "Heartbreak Hotel" was the No 1 song on the country juke box chart and No. 2 on the retail chart. "Heartbreak Hotel" was also No. 1 on the year-end pop chart.
 Johnny Cash, landed multiple records on the year-end charts, including "I Walk the Line" (No. 2 jockeys, No. 3 retail) and "Folsom Prison Blues"  (No. 19 jockeys).
 Carl Perkins' "Blue Suede Shoes" ranked No. 2 on the year-end country juke box chart (No. 4 retail) and also placed at No. 18 on the year-end pop chart.

In the first appearance by an African-American artist on the country year-end chart, Fats Domino's "Blueberry Hill" ranked No. 23 on the year-end retail chart.

See also
List of Billboard number-one country songs of 1956
Billboard year-end top 30 singles of 1956
1956 in country music

References

1956 record charts
Billboard charts
1956 in American music